Gaius Julius Polybius (fl. 1st century ) was a freedman of Emperor Claudius who was elevated to the secretariat during his reign.  He assisted Claudius in his literary, judicial and historical pursuits as a researcher before the emperor's accession and this became Polybius' official role in the imperial bureaucracy, with the title a studiis. Suetonius, the biographer and secretary to the Emperor Hadrian, claims that Claudius was so appreciative of his help that Polybius was allowed to walk between the consuls when on official business.

When Polybius lost a brother in the early 40s CE, Seneca the Younger, (who was then in exile,) wrote his famous Ad Polybium in response.  The intent seems to have been to gain Polybius' support for Seneca's recall to Rome.  In the work, Polybius is praised for his loyalty to Claudius, but is also admonished that service to an emperor must come before grief.  It had no effect on the freedman and Seneca remained in exile.

Disloyalty led Polybius to his downfall.  He was executed for crimes against the state, supporting the view that freedmen were still in a position inferior to emperor, whatever their influence.  Ancient historians claimed that Empress Messalina arranged for his death when she tired of him as a lover.

He was probably the father of a prominent politician Caius Julius Polybius, whose house was found in Pompeii.

References

Further reading
  (Online in English).   (Online in Latin).

1st-century Romans
Emperor's slaves and freedmen